Himan Brown (July 21, 1910 – June 4, 2010), also known as Hi Brown, was an American producer of radio and television programs. Over seven decades, Brown produced and directed more than 30,000 radio shows, for all of the major radio networks and syndication. He worked with such actors as Helen Hayes, Boris Karloff, Peter Lorre, Gregory Peck, Frank Sinatra and Orson Welles.

A recipient of the American Broadcast Pioneer and Peabody Awards, Brown was inducted in 1990s into the National Radio Hall of Fame.

Early life
The son of a tailor from a shtetl near the Ukrainian seaport of Odessa, Brown first learned about radio from a shop teacher at Brooklyn's Boys High School. At the age of 18, he began broadcasting on New York's WEAF, reading newspapers with a Yiddish dialect. One of his listeners was Gertrude Berg who wanted him to play Jake, her husband on The Goldbergs, which he did for six months. He continued as a radio actor but soon began to pitch shows directly to advertising agencies.

While at Brooklyn College, he recruited fellow student Irwin Shaw to write scripts, giving the author his first paid writing job. Shaw later based a character on Brown in his 1951 novel about the radio industry, The Troubled Air.  In 1931, he earned a bachelor of arts degree from Brooklyn College and a law degree from Brooklyn Law School, where he was valedictorian.

On the air
Over 65 years, Brown produced more than 30,000 radio programs, including The Adventures of the Thin Man, The Affairs of Peter Salem, Bulldog Drummond, CBS Radio Mystery Theater, City Desk, Dick Tracy, Flash Gordon, The General Mills Radio Adventure Theater, Grand Central Station, Green Valley, USA, The Gumps, Inner Sanctum Mysteries, Joyce Jordan, M.D., Marie, the Little French Princess, The NBC Radio Theater, The Private Files of Rex Saunders, Terry and the Pirates and numerous daytime soap operas. During World War II, he worked with the Writers' War Board, producing patriotic serials to aid the war effort.

Brown directed many episodes of shows he produced. In 1951–55, he directed the NBC detective drama, Barrie Craig, Confidential Investigator.

In the 1950s, he bought Adolph Zukor's Famous Players Studios at 221 West 26th Street (now Chelsea Studios) to produce his shows.

When television arrived, Brown produced 26 episodes of the syndicated Inner Sanctum TV series, plus a daytime show, Morning Matinee. Realizing that "all these guys making TV, they have to have a set," he profited by acquiring the studios in Chelsea; they were used for 35 years by New York TV production firms.

Through his non-profit educational foundation, Brown produced They Were Giants, radio programs dramatizing the lives of such literary figures as Walt Whitman and H. G. Wells, and We, The Living, fact-based dramas about the lives of senior citizens.

Brown also taught audio drama at Brooklyn College and the School of Visual Arts.

Personal life 
In 1938, Brown moved to a ten-room apartment at 285 Central Park West, where he would live the rest of his life.

Brown had two children, Barry Kenneth Brown and Hilda Joan Brown, two grandchildren, and four great-grandchildren.

Hi Brown’s second marriage was with Shirley Goodman who was the President of the Fashion Institute of Technology in New York City. 

Brown died on June 4, 2010.

References

External links
  CBS Radio Mystery Theater (complete collection) Internet Archive, Retrieved September 15, 2011
 Inner Sanctum Mysteries (166 episodes) Internet Archive
 Himan Brown official site
   Himan Brown Radio Collection at The Walter J. Brown Media Archives & Peabody Awards Collection
Pop Chronicles Interviews #136 – Himan Brown, Part 1 & Part 2, April 18, 1977.

1910 births
American radio directors
American radio producers
Radio personalities from New York City
2010 deaths
Peabody Award winners
Brooklyn College alumni
Brooklyn Law School alumni
Boys High School (Brooklyn) alumni